Mária Katerinka Czaková (born 2 October 1988, in Nitra) is a Slovak race walker. She competed in the 20 km kilometres event at the 2012 and 2016 Summer Olympics.  She also represented Slovakia at four World Championships (2011, 2013, 2015 and 2017). In 2019, she competed in the women's 50 kilometres walk at the 2019 World Athletics Championships held in Doha, Qatar. She did not finish her race.

References

External links 
 Mária Czaková at the Slovenský Olympijský Výbor 

1988 births
Living people
Sportspeople from Nitra
Slovak female racewalkers
Olympic athletes of Slovakia
Athletes (track and field) at the 2012 Summer Olympics
Athletes (track and field) at the 2016 Summer Olympics
Athletes (track and field) at the 2020 Summer Olympics
World Athletics Championships athletes for Slovakia